Madona District was an administrative division of Latvia, located in Vidzeme and Latgale regions, in the country's east. Within the district is the highest point in Latvia - Gaiziņkalns. The district also bordered Latvia's largest lake, Lake Lubāns.

Districts were eliminated during the administrative-territorial reform in 2009.

Cities
Cesvaine
Lubāna
Madona
Varakļāni

Districts of Latvia